Charles Watt Lamson (March 14, 1939 – November 23, 2015) was a  professional American football player who played defensive back for the Minnesota Vikings and Los Angeles Rams of the National Football League (NFL).

References

1939 births
2015 deaths
American football safeties
Iowa State Cyclones football players
Los Angeles Rams players
Minnesota Vikings players
Wyoming Cowboys football players
People from Evergreen, Colorado
People from Webster City, Iowa
Players of American football from Iowa